Louren Steenkamp (born 8 May 1997) is a South African cricketer. He made his first-class debut for North West in the 2017–18 Sunfoil 3-Day Cup on 23 November 2017. He made his List A debut for North West in the 2018–19 CSA Provincial One-Day Challenge on 21 October 2018.

References

External links
 

1997 births
Living people
South African cricketers
North West cricketers
Place of birth missing (living people)